Sauvageau may refer to:

 Benoît Sauvageau (1963–2006), a Canadian politician
 Camille Sauvageau (1861-1936), French phycologist
 Charles Sauvageau (1807-1849), a Canadian conductor, composer and music educator
 Danièle Sauvageau, the former head coach of the Canadian national women's hockey team
 Paul-Émile Sauvageau (1918–2003), a Canadian politician
 Tancrède Sauvageau (1819–1892), a merchant and political figure in Canada East